South Dixon Township is located in Lee County, Illinois. As of the 2010 census, its population was 918 and it contained 393 housing units.  South Dixon was formed from Dixon Township on February 12, 1867.

Geography

Demographics

References

External links
US Census
City-data.com
Cook County Official Site
Illinois State Archives

Townships in Lee County, Illinois
1867 establishments in Illinois
Townships in Illinois